The Kareem Abdul-Jabbar Social Justice Champion Award is an annual National Basketball Association (NBA) award which honors players who are making strides in the fight for social justice. The award was created in 2021 and named after Kareem Abdul-Jabbar, a six-time NBA champion whose involvement with social issues dates back to the civil rights movement. All 30 teams nominate one player from their roster to be the Kareem Abdul-Jabbar Social Justice Champion, then the finalists and winner will be selected by a committee composed of NBA legends, league executives and social justice leaders. The winner selects an organization which will receive a $100,000 contribution on their behalf. The other fours finalists choose an organization to receive $25,000. The award is similar to the National Football League's Walter Payton Man of the Year Award, in which every team names a nominee who excelled in charity work.

After the 2020–21 season, Carmelo Anthony was named the inaugural winner of the award.

Winners

References

National Basketball Association awards
Awards established in 2021